The Papua New Guinean ambassador in Beijing is the official representative of the government in Port Moresby to the Government of the People's Republic of China.

List of representatives

China–Papua New Guinea relations

References 

 
Papua New Guinea
China